Bridging Finance Inc. is a Canadian private lender based in Ontario that was placed in receivership by the Ontario Court of Justice following an investigation by the Ontario Securities Commission (OSC).  Several of Bridging's former executives are under investigation by regulatory authorities in Ontario.  Investors in the firm's funds are expected to lose approximately 58-66% of their capital.  That would be one of the "largest collapses of an investment fund in Canadian history." The Ontario Securities Commission alleges that former CEO David Sharpe, former Chief Investment Officer Natasha Sharpe and former Chief Compliance Officer, Andrew Mushore "committed fraud, misappropriated funds, made misleading or untrue statements and misled investigators."

History and ownership
Bridging is owned by Natasha Sharpe, Jenny Coco and Rocky Coco (the Cocos are brother and sister owners of Coco Paving Inc.).  Sharpe worked with the Cocos in a previous role at the Bank of Montreal where she provided commercial banking services to Coco Paving.  Sharpe joined the board of directors of the Coco Group in 2011.  Subsequently, the Cocos provided capital to launch Bridging in 2012.

In 2019, Nastasha Sharpe and other shareholders agreed to sell 50% of Bridging's equity to Gary Ng for $50 million.  It was later revealed that Ng paid for the investment with the proceeds of a $32 million loan that he received from one of Bridging's credit funds.  This use of client money to fund a capital transaction that benefited Bridging's owners is one of the transactions listed by the OSC as being under investigation

Conflicts of interest and misuse of client funds
The principle conflicts of interest being investigated by the OSC:

1. Payments from Sean McCoshen related to loans made to McCoshen's company Alaska-Alberta Railway Development Corporation.  The OSC alleges that following the funding of loans to various McCoshen companies, McCoshen funnelled a total of $19.5 million to David Sharpe, largely through his personal chequing account. The OSC also alleges that Natasha Sharpe received $250,000 from one of McCoshen's companies.

2. Use of Bridging client funds to pay for purchase of Ninepoint Partners LP's management interest in Sprott Bridging Income Fund LP.  With the cooperation of Rishi Gautam, who was a Bridging borrower at the time, the OSC alleges that the Sharpes and Mushmore misappropriated $40 million to pay for the purchase, which ultimately benefited Bridging's shareholders Natasha Sharpe and the Cocos.

3. The use of Bridging client funds to enable Gary Ng to purchase 50% of Bridging's shares from Natasha Sharpe and the Cocos.  After Ng was the majority shareholder Bridging, Bridging provided additional loans to various Ng-controlled  companies.  The OSC also states that Ng paid $500,000 to each of David and Natasha Sharpe in November 2019.  According to the OSC, "neither payment served a legitimate commercial purpose".

Receivership and financial recovery for investors
Bridging was placed into receivership by the Ontario Court of justice on 30 April 2021.  PwC terminated David Sharpe and Natasha Sharpe within days of taking over as receiver.

In its role as receiver, PricewaterhouseCoopers (PwC) launched a process to sell Bridging's debt portfolio. The proceeds of the sale would be used to partially repay investors in Bridging's private credit funds.  In April 2022, PwC stated that the bids that it received for the portfolio were below the likely value of an orderly liquidation.  PWC then recommended to the court that the portfolio be allowed run-off over a five-year period. PwC's estimates of likely recoveries were between 34% - 42%, resulting in total losses of approximately $1.3 billion out of the peak assets of $2.09 billion.

References

Companies based in Toronto
Financial services companies established in 2012
2012 establishments in Ontario
Fraud in Canada
Corporate scandals